Pseudopanthea is a genus of moths of the family Noctuidae.

Species
Pseudopanthea palata (Grote, 1880)

References
Pseudopanthea at funet

Pantheinae